Red Lake is a lake in Douglas County, Wisconsin, United States.

External links

WDNR maps
WDNR Water Quality 
Red Lake Association

Lakes of Wisconsin
Lakes of Douglas County, Wisconsin